Nikolay Yuryevich Zograf (1851–1919) was a Russian zoologist and anthropologist, Chevalier of the Order of Légion d'honneur.

References

1851 births
1919 deaths
Russian zoologists
Russian anthropologists
Chevaliers of the Légion d'honneur